Country Creatures is a collaborative remix extended play (EP) by Icelandic musician Björk; Swedish musician Karin Dreijer under their alias Fever Ray; and electronic music duo the Knife, consisting of Dreijer and their brother, DJ and record producer Olof Dreijer. The three remixes were initially released digitally as individual singles on 6 September 2019 followed by a limited edition 12" vinyl by One Little Indian Records released on 1 November 2019.

Background

Country Creatures takes its title from the two songs remixed in the collection: "This Country" from Fever Ray's album Plunge, and "Features Creatures" from Björk's Utopia, both released in 2017; one cover art of the EP combines those of both albums. In a social media post announcing the collab, Björk revealed that she chose the Fever Ray track she would remix and vice versa.

On 5 September 2019, Fever Ray shared a photo on their Instagram page featuring them and Björk with a countdown clock. At midnight, three separate remix singles were released, one a remix of Fever Ray's "This Country" done by Björk and two remixes of "Features Creatures", one by Fever Ray and the other by the Knife. Despite the fact that the Knife officially disbanded in 2014, Stereogum notes that the name is sometimes still used on remixes. Björk adds her own vocals to Fever Ray's track, and her remix is titled "This Country Makes It Hard to Fuck".

It was also announced that the three remixes would be collected in a limited edition vinyl called Country Creatures, released by Björk's label One Little Indian on 1 November 2019.

Critical reception

Consequence of Sound noted Björk's reworking of Fever Ray's "This Country", calling it "a disturbing, dissonant industrial collage" and praised their newly added vocals as "haunting".  It described Fever Ray's "Features Creatures" remix as "moody atmospherics" and noted the Knife's more dance-oriented take on the track, and in comparing the two felt that they offered "a fascinating look at [Karin Dreijer's] different musical palettes".

Track listing

Versions
"Features Creatures"

 Album version (CD/digital) – 4:50
 Album version (vinyl) – 4:41
 Fever Ray Remix – 4:07
 The Knife Remix – 4:36

"This Country"
 Album version – 3:12
 Björk Remix – 3:02

Release history

References

2019 albums
Albums produced by Björk
Fever Ray albums
The Knife albums
Björk albums
One Little Independent Records albums